Vlasiy Sinyavskiy (born 27 November 1996) is an Estonian professional footballer who plays as a forward for club Slovácko and the Estonia national team.

Club career

He signed for MFK Karviná in February 2021.

Sinyavskiy signed for Slovácko in May 2022.

International career
Sinyavskiy received Estonian citizenship in 2016. Before that, he held Russian citizenship, which he had to give up because of getting an Estonian one. He made his senior international debut for Estonia on 8 June 2019, starting on the left wing in a 1–2 home loss to Northern Ireland in a UEFA Euro 2020 qualifying match.

Honours

Club
Flora
Meistriliiga: 2019

References

External links

1996 births
Living people
Sportspeople from Narva
Estonian people of Russian descent
Estonian footballers
Association football forwards
Esiliiga players
FC Puuma Tallinn players
Meistriliiga players
JK Narva Trans players
Nõmme Kalju FC players
Viljandi JK Tulevik players
FC Flora players
Estonia youth international footballers
Estonia under-21 international footballers
Estonia international footballers
Tallinna JK Legion players
MFK Karviná players
Estonian expatriate footballers
Estonian expatriate sportspeople in the Czech Republic
Expatriate footballers in the Czech Republic
1. FC Slovácko players